Samina Ahmad is a Pakistani film and television actress, stage performer, producer and director. She is a veteran television actress with over 50 years of work experience in the Urdu entertainment industry. Ahmad performed for many of PTV's major successful series, including Waris (1979), Aahat (1991) and Family Front (1997). One of her most recent roles includes the Geo TV's widely-popular four-part comedy series Kis Ki Aayegi Baraat (2009–2012), and the Hum TV's acclaimed comedy drama series Suno Chanda (2018) and its sequel Suno Chanda 2 (2019). For her contributions towards the television industry, she was honoured by the Government of Pakistan with the Pride of Performance in 2011.

Early life and career 
Ahmad was born in Lahore, Punjab, Pakistan on 20 March 1950. Her father was Director of Forests in the West of Pakistan, and her mother was a housewife. Her father died in 1965 and her mother in 2018. She is the elder among her five siblings. She has a Masters in Home Economics.

Ahmad had started her career with serious plays on Pakistan Television Corporation (PTV), however she is known for comedy plays like Akkar Bakkar, Taal Matol, Alif Noon and Such Gup.  She also acted in the famous comedy drama Family Front (1997 Comedy Drama TV Series). She has recently acted in another TV comedy named Side Order. Her switch to the comic roles proved to be highly rewarding for her, and she quickly became a top media person in Pakistan. When asked in an interview about what she values most in life, her prompt reply was, "Humanity". Samina Ahmad was just an 18-year-old college student in Lahore, Pakistan, when she first started working for Pakistan Television Corporation. During her long career, she had also worked at Alhamra Arts Council, Lahore as a Program Director for two decades. Despite her busy professional career, Samina Ahmed has also been an active member of Women's Action Forum in Pakistan.

Ahmad was a programme director at Alhamra Arts Council in Lahore while also performing on television. In 1997, she launched her own television company named as Samina Ahmad Productions, which produced the widely-popular TV drama Family Front.

Personal life
Ahmad was married to a Pakistani filmmaker Fariduddin Ahmed, the son of veteran filmmaker W.Z. Ahmed, who made a popular Pakistani film Waada (1957). The couple has a son, and a daughter together. Fariduddin divorced her, a few years before his death in 1993, the reason being his love for the actress Shamim Ara, who he later married. Ahmad married actor Manzar Sehbai on 4 April 2020, in a private Nikah ceremony in Lahore.

Filmography

Films

Television

Web series

Awards and recognition

References

External links 
 

Pakistani television actresses
Pakistani television directors
Living people
Pakistani stage actresses
Recipients of the Pride of Performance
Actresses from Karachi
Actresses from Lahore
20th-century Pakistani actresses
21st-century Pakistani actresses
PTV Award winners
Nigar Award winners
1950 births
Pakistani film actresses
Women television directors
Actresses in Urdu cinema